Hu Zhuangyou, was a Chinese chemist, educator and former President of Zhejiang University.

Biography
Hu's birth and death years are missing. Hu was born in Wuxi, Jiangsu Province. Hu's courtesy name was Yuruo.

Hu entered Nanyang Public School (南洋公学; main root of current Shanghai Jiao Tong University) in Shanghai and spent seven years studying there. After graduation, Hu continued to study chemistry in the United States.

From 1913 to 1914, Hu was the president of Zhejiang Advanced College (current Zhejiang University) in Hangzhou. From 1932 to 1936, Hu was a professor of chemistry in the Department of Chemistry of Peking University in Beijing. Hu retired in 1947.

References

External links
 President of Zhejiang University: Hu Zhuangyou (from Zhejiang University)
 The history of the College of Chemistry and Molecular Engineering, Peking University
 Archive of early-period oversea Chinese students from Wuxi

Academic staff of Zhejiang University
Academic staff of Peking University
Chemists from Jiangsu
Educators from Wuxi
Year of birth missing
Year of death missing
Scientists from Wuxi
Presidents of Zhejiang University
National Chiao Tung University (Shanghai) alumni